Twins Language is an album by Hong Kong duo Twins. It is their third mandarin album. It was released in January 2008. It is their last album before break-up.

Background
The album was recorded in 2007. It was released on January 8, 2008, two months before their break up. They reunited in 2010 with album Everyone Bounce.

Track listing
"Cute - Repulsive" (Charlene Choi version)
"Younger Sister"
"60 分"
"Mutual Relationship"
"酷"
"Cute - Repulsive" (Gillian Chung version)
"Can You See It?" (Gillian Solo)
"季节 限定"
"自由行 不行"
"飘零 燕 (国语 版)"

References

External links
 :zh:桐話妍語

2008 albums
Twins (group) albums